The 2020 General Tire 100 was the 12th stock car race of the 2020 ARCA Menards Series, the sixth race of the 2020 Sioux Chief Showdown, and the inaugural iteration of the event. The race was held on Friday, August 14, 2020, in Daytona Beach, Florida, at the Daytona International Speedway road course, a  permanent road course that uses part of the Daytona oval and infield road course. The race took the scheduled 28 laps to complete. After hours of delay, Michael Self of Venturini Motorsports would control the late stages of the race to win his ninth and to date, final career ARCA Menards Series win, his second and final of the season, and would complete a Daytona sweep. To fill out the podium, Ty Gibbs of Joe Gibbs Racing and Sam Mayer of GMS Racing would finish second and third, respectively.

Background

Entry list

Practice 
The only 45-minute practice session was held on Friday, August 14.

Starting lineup 
ARCA would not hold qualifying for the event, and would decide to determine the starting lineup based on the current 2020 Sioux Chief Showdown owner's standings. As a result, Chandler Smith of Venturini Motorsports would win the pole.

Full starting lineup

Race results

References 

2020 ARCA Menards Series
NASCAR races at Daytona International Speedway
August 2020 sports events in the United States
2020 in sports in Florida